Wiang Sa Surat Thani City Football Club is a Thai football club based in Wiang Sa, Surat Thani Province. The club currently plays in the Thai League 3 Southern region.

The club established in 2010 as Kabin Buri Football Club

In 2017 (Sinthana)Kabinburi Football Club was taken over by a group of funds from Surat Thani and moved to Surat Thani Province and changed its name to Surat Thani City Football Club

In 2021 Surat Thani City Football Club was taken over by My Home Development group and renamed to MH Khon-Surat City Football Club

In 2022 MH Khon-Surat City Football Club renamed to Wiang Sa Surat Thani City Football Club after Wiang Sa City Football Club changed its name to MH Nakhonsi City Football Club

Stadium and locations

Season by season record

Players

Current squad

See also
Surat Thani F.C.
Kabin City F.C.
Kabin United F.C.

References

External links

Association football clubs established in 2010
Football clubs in Thailand
Prachinburi province
2010 establishments in Thailand